The barred-fin moray or bar-tail moray (Gymnothorax zonipectis) is a species of marine fish in the family Muraenidae.

Description
The barred-fin moray is a medium-sized fish that can reach a maximum length of 50 cm, but the ones usually observed are about 30 cm.
It is serpentine in shape, its body has a light brown color and it is covered with a mix of darker spots and broken and irregular dark brown lines.
A relatively large whitish spot is located below the back corner of the eye.

Distribution & habitat
The barred-fin moray is widespread throughout the Indo-Pacific area from the eastern coast of Africa to Polynesia and Hawaii, and also from Taiwan to New Caledonia.

Biology
The barred-fin moray is a carnivore, solitary, secretive and benthic animal. During daytime, it sits in a shelter where it lives often invisible and at night, it goes out to actively hunt prey, consisting of small fishes.

References

External links
http://www.marinespecies.org/aphia.php?p=taxdetails&id=217506
http://www.fishbase.org/summary/5397
http://doris.ffessm.fr/fiche2.asp?fiche_numero=1739&fiche_etat=4&origine=
Fishes of Australia : Gymnothorax zonipectis
 

Gymnothorax
Marine fish of Northern Australia
Fish described in 1906